Ride Him, Cowboy is a 1932 pre-Code Western film directed by Fred Allen for Warner Brothers, starring a 25-year-old John Wayne. Based on the 1923 novel of the same name by Kenneth Perkins, the film is a remake of The Unknown Cavalier, a 1926 silent Western starring Ken Maynard, with much stock footage from the original. The film was released as The Hawk in the U.K.

Plot

John Drury is passing through when townsfolk are about to kill Duke, a horse they believe to be dangerous. He convinces them to spare the animal if he can ride it. He does, earning the gratitude of Ruth Gaunt.

He then volunteers to deal with an outlaw known as the Hawk who has been terrorizing the area. Solid citizen Henry Simms volunteers to guide him to the Hawk's territory. But Simms is actually the Hawk and he ties Drury to a tree, leaving him to die. Simms then leads a raid on a ranch, kills a man, and plants Drury's harmonica at the scene. With the help of his horse Duke, Drury manages to free himself.

A group of vigilantes, believing that Drury is the Hawk, accuse him of murder and take him to face a hanging judge. Fortunately, Ruth shows up with the news that a wounded witness has regained consciousness and confirmed Drury's claim that Simms is the real bandit.

Simms's men burst in and hold everyone at gunpoint. Simms takes Ruth with him to his hideout, but Drury manages to escape and follow them. The posse overpowers Simms's henchmen and captures the rest of the gang. Simms and Drury fight; when Drury is distracted by the arrival of help, Simms knocks him out and tries to flee, only to run into the deadly hooves of an enraged Duke.

Cast
 John Wayne as John Drury
 Ruth Hall as Ruth Gaunt
 Henry B. Walthall as John Gaunt
 Otis Harlan as Judge E. Clarence "Necktie" Jones
 Harry Gribbon as Deputy Sheriff Clout
 Frank Hagney as Henry Simms / The Hawk
 Murdock MacQuarrie as	Doctor (uncredited)
 Glenn Strange as Henchman (uncredited)

Box Office
According to Warner Bros records the film earned $164,000 domestically and $60,000 foreign.

See also
 John Wayne filmography

References

External links

 
 
 
 
 

1932 films
Sound film remakes of silent films
Remakes of American films
1932 Western (genre) films
American Western (genre) films
American black-and-white films
Films based on American novels
Films based on Western (genre) novels
Films directed by Fred Allen (film editor)
Warner Bros. films
1930s English-language films
1930s American films